Micropterix uxoria is a species of moth belonging to the family Micropterigidae. It was described by Walsingham in 1919 and is endemic to Sicily.

References

External links
 lepiforum.de

Micropterigidae
Moths described in 1919
Moths of Europe
Endemic fauna of Sicily
Taxa named by Thomas de Grey, 6th Baron Walsingham